Thessalon is a town in the Canadian province of Ontario, located at the junction of Highway 17 and Highway 129 on the north shore of Lake Huron. It is surrounded by, but not part of, the municipality of Huron Shores, and is part of Algoma District. The main industries are timber and tourism. The town is a popular retirement community. It is the administrative headquarters of the Thessalon First Nation an Ojibwe First Nations with a reserve, Thessalon 12.

History

Appears on early maps as Tessalon (Galinée, 1670), and later as Pointe aux Thessalons (Bellin, 1775).  A corruption of an earlier Amerindian descriptive Neyashewun, meaning "a point of land".

The region was first surveyed in 1869. The survey was done to determine if the area could support a viable lumber industry. By the winter of 1870 the beginnings of a lumber camp had taken root and in 1877 a more permanent settlement was established. Thessalon was incorporated in 1892. Nathaniel Dyment of Barrie, the owner of Dyment Co., one of the earliest and most prominent lumber companies in the area, is considered the founding figure of Thessalon.

Recreation 
There is an arena, a curling club and one primary school in the town. The town was also home to the Thessalon Flyers. The Voyageur Hiking Trail passes near the community.

The Thessalon River flows through the town and into Lake Huron at Water Street. Fishing is excellent in the river:  yellow perch, pickerel, bass, northwater salmon and muskie.

Demographics 

Population trend:
 Population in 2016: 1,286
 Population in 2011: 1,279
 Population in 2006: 1,312
 Population in 2001: 1,386
 Population in 1996: 1,485
 Population in 1991: 1,543

Transportation
Ontario Northland provides intercity motor coach service to Thessalon as a stop along its Sault Ste. Marie–Sudbury–North Bay–Ottawa route, with one bus a day each headed eastbound and westbound from Sunday to Friday, with no service on Saturdays.

The Thessalon railway station was once a divisional point along the Canadian Pacific Railway's Sudbury–Soo Line. Passenger service began in the area around 1905, and a station building was constructed around 1910. With dwindling passenger traffic along the line, service was gradually discontinued, and the station was demolished sometime after 1971.

Notable residents

 Henry Horricks (1883 - 1968), pacifist, was born near Thessalon

References

External links

Municipalities in Algoma District
Single-tier municipalities in Ontario
Towns in Ontario